Eylaki-ye Bala (also Romanized as ‘Eylakī-ye Bālā, ‘Eylaqī Bālā, and ‘Īlakī Bālā; also known as Ailaki and ‘Eylakī) is a village in Barakuh Rural District, Jolgeh-e Mazhan District, Khusf County, South Khorasan Province, Iran. At the 2006 census, its population was 84, in 22 families.

References 

Populated places in Khusf County